Harold "Slim" Jenkins (1890–1967) was the prominent African-American founder of the Slim Jenkins Cafe, a premier night club in West Oakland in the 1930s through the 1960s that featured such stars as B.B. King, The Ink Spots, Dinah Washington, and other major jazz and blues groups. Both the nightclub's centrality and Jenkins' charismatic personality earned him the nickname the "Mayor" of West Oakland. The cafe, located on Wood Street between 7th and 8th Street, was an important part of the rise of the 7th Street corridor, an epicenter of Black culture in the Bay Area including soul food restaurants, clubs, and other black-owned businesses. In addition to music, the club was also a popular spot for hosting black men's social clubs and other groups that increased the visibility of African-American life within the city of Oakland.

Early life 
On July 22, 1890, Harold Jenkins was born in Monroe, Louisiana. After World War I, Jenkins moved to Oakland, California and worked as waiter.

References 

1890 births

1967 deaths
Nightclub owners
African-American founders
Businesspeople from Oakland, California